The poker boom was a period between 2003 and 2006, during which poker, primarily no-limit Texas hold 'em, but also other variations, became considerably more popular around the world. During the boom years, the online poker player pool at least doubled in size every year.

Causes
The seeds of the boom began in 1998, with the release of the film Rounders and the introduction of online poker at Planet Poker.  These events built on the occasional telecasts of the World Series of Poker (WSOP) Main Events that were recorded each summer and broadcast later in the year.

Two specific 2003 triggers completed the launch of the poker boom. In the spring of 2003, the World Poker Tour's inaugural season debuted on the Travel Channel on American cable television. The impact of the boom was escalated in May 2003, when amateur Chris Moneymaker won the 2003 WSOP Main Event. Moneymaker won his seat via a $86 satellite tournament on the PokerStars online poker room. Moneymaker was one of 839 entrants in the 2003 event, an increase of roughly 200 players from 2002 and almost doubling the 393 competitors that played in 1999.  By the next year, the field in the 2004 Main Event more than tripled to 2576 players.  By the 2006 Main Event, there were 8773 competitors, some 14 times as many as had entered the last 2002 pre-boom Main Event.

It is also believed that the NHL lockout of 2004-05, and the subsequent filling of ESPN air time with poker programming influenced the poker boom. Another view holds that the poker boom was a classic speculative bubble.

Decline
The end of the boom is generally considered to be October 2006, when the Unlawful Internet Gambling Enforcement Act of 2006 (UIGEA) became law in the United States, and several online poker sites, including the industry leader at the time, Party Poker, left the United States. In the first WSOP following the passage of UIGEA, attendance in the WSOP Main Event dropped nearly 28%, from 8773 in 2006 to 6358 at the 2007 Main Event.

The game today remains much more popular than the pre-boom period, with WSOP Main Event attendance having stabilized near the 2007 level, in part due to higher growth levels internationally.

Based on the 6685 entries to the July 2011 launch of the 2011 Main Event, it appears that the "Black Friday" indictments, on April 15, 2011, have not reduced the recent level of poker activity.  Three of the biggest online poker sites serving players in the United States had their web domains seized and shut down by U.S. Attorney's Office for the Southern District of New York, which alleged they were in violation of federal bank fraud and money laundering laws. Nevertheless, two of them continue to serve the international player pool, and numerous smaller sites continue to allow U.S. players.

See also

Bigger Deal: A Year Inside the Poker Boom
Moneymaker effect

References

Poker and society